John Wood (17 February 1894 – 9 September 1971) was a Scottish professional footballer who played as a forward for a number of Scottish League clubs. He also played in the Football League for Manchester United.

Career statistics

References

External links

Profile at StretfordEnd.co.uk
Profile at MUFCInfo.com

1894 births
1971 deaths
Scottish footballers
Dumbarton F.C. players
Manchester United F.C. players
Hibernian F.C. players
Dunfermline Athletic F.C. players
Association football forwards
People from Leven, Fife
Scottish Football League players
English Football League players
Lochgelly United F.C. players
St Mirren F.C. players
East Stirlingshire F.C. players
East Fife F.C. players
Alloa Athletic F.C. players
Footballers from Fife